Jerilderie Shire was a local government area in the Riverina region of southern New South Wales, Australia.  The Shire was located adjacent to the Newell Highway. The Shire was declared in 1918 after the amalgamation of the former Municipality of Jerilderie (1889 – 1918) and Wunnamurra Shire (1906 – 1918). It was dissolved in 2016 after its amalgamation with Murrumbidgee Shire to create Murrumbidgee Council

At the time of dissolution, Jerilderie Shire was the second smallest local government area in New South Wales, in terms of population.

The final mayor of Jerilderie Shire was Cr. Ruth McRae, an unaligned politician. The seat of the council was located in Jerilderie, the only significant town in the Shire.

Amalgamation
A 2015 review of local government boundaries by the NSW Government Independent Pricing and Regulatory Tribunal recommended that the Jerilderie Shire merge adjoining councils. The government considered three proposals. The Jerilderie Shire Council submitted an alternate proposal to the Minister for Local Government that the entire Jerilderie Shire amalgamate with the Murrumbidgee Shire.

Jerilderie Shire was dissolved on 12 May 2016 with the area, along with Murrumbidgee Shire, incorporated into the new Murrumbidgee Council.

Composition and election method

At the time of dissolution, Jerilderie Shire Council was composed of seven councillors elected proportionally as one entire ward. All councillors were elected for a fixed four-year term of office. The mayor was elected by the councillors at the first meeting of the council. The final election was held on 8 September 2012.

References

Former local government areas of New South Wales
2016 disestablishments in Australia